The governor of the State of Hawaii is the head of government of Hawaii, and commander-in-chief of the state's military forces. The governor has a duty to enforce state laws; the power to either approve or veto bills passed by the Hawaii Legislature; the power to convene the legislature;  and the power to grant pardons, except in cases of treason and impeachment.

Of the eight governors of the state, two have been elected to three terms, four have been elected to two terms, and one has been elected to one term. No state governor has yet resigned or died in office, nor did any territorial governor die in office. George Ariyoshi was the first Asian American to be governor of any U.S. state. The current governor is Democrat Josh Green, who took office on December 5, 2022.

The longest-serving governors are John A. Burns (1962–1974) and George Ariyoshi (1974–1986), both of whom served 12 years each.

Governors
The Republic of Hawaii was annexed by the United States in 1898. It was organized into Hawaii Territory in 1900, and admitted as a state in 1959. The Republic had only one president, Sanford B. Dole, who later was the first territorial governor.

Governors of Hawaii Territory
Hawaii Territory was organized on June 14, 1900, remaining a territory for 59 years. Twelve people served as territorial governor, appointed by the president of the United States.

Governors of the State of Hawaii

Hawaii was admitted to the Union on August 21, 1959, consisting of Hawaii Territory minus Palmyra Atoll. Since then, there have been nine governors.

The governor is elected to a four-year term commencing on the first Monday in the December following the election. The lieutenant governor is elected for the same term and, since 1964, on the same ticket as the governor.  The 1978 constitutional convention established a term limit of two consecutive terms for both offices. If the office of governor is vacant, the lieutenant governor becomes governor; if the governor is out of the state or unable to fulfill duties, the lieutenant governor acts as governor during such absence or disability.

See also
List of governors of Hawaii (island)
List of governors of Maui
List of governors of Oahu
List of governors of Kauai

Notes

References

General

 
 
 

Constitution

 

Specific

External links

 Office of the Governor of Hawaii

Governors
Lists of state governors of the United States